Suillus albidipes is a species of edible mushroom in the genus Suillus native to North America.

See also
List of North American boletes

References

External links
Rogers Mushrooms - Suillus albidipes Mushroom

albidipes
Edible fungi
Fungi of North America
Fungi described in 1912